Dmitry Vasilyevich Putyata was a General of the Imperial Russian Army and a Russian explorer of the Pamir Mountains. In 1883 he explored Karakul Lake, Tashkurgan Town, the Bendersky Pass to the Wakhan Valley and westward along the Ghunt River.  He covered more territory than any previous or subsequent expedition.  In the 1890s Putyata served on Russian General Staff as a specialist on China. In the late 1890s, Putyata as a military Attaché to Korea was sent to Korean Empire to modernize the Imperial Korean Army with some other officers as a request of Min Young-hwan, the Minister of War of Korean Empire who visited Russia before. However, he had conflicts with Min and tried to go back to Russia. According to the report of French Embassy in Korea, Putyata was unhappy about his payment in Korea and wanted to go back to Russia. Finally on 12 June 1897, Putyata was permitted to go back to Russia. But because he had to write reports, Putyata stayed in Korea. Finally on 24 August 1897, Putyata was permitted to go back to Russia before the successor's arrival.

References

Explorers from the Russian Empire
Explorers of Central Asia
Imperial Russian Army personnel
19th-century people from the Russian Empire